Stonesifer is a surname. Notable people with the surname include:

Don Stonesifer (born 1927), American football player
Patty Stonesifer (born 1956), American business executive
Richard J. Stonesifer (1922–1999), fifth President of Monmouth University

See also
 Stonecipher